Arnold Raymond Cream (January 31, 1914 – February 25, 1994), best known as Jersey Joe Walcott, was an American professional boxer who competed from 1930 to 1953. He held the NYSAC, NBA, and The Ring heavyweight titles from 1951 to 1952, and broke the record for the oldest man to win the title, at the age of 37. That record would eventually be broken in 1994 by 45-year-old George Foreman. Despite holding the world heavyweight title for a relatively short period of time, Walcott was regarded among the best heavyweights in the world during the 1940s and 1950s.

After retiring from boxing, Walcott did some acting, playing small parts in a few movies and television shows. He also refereed several boxing matches, but after the controversial ending to the second fight between Muhammad Ali and Sonny Liston, Walcott was not asked to referee again. From 1971 to 1974, Walcott held the elected position of Sheriff of Camden County, New Jersey, the first African-American to do so. From 1975 to 1984, he was the chairman of the New Jersey State Athletic Commission.

Early life
Walcott was born in Pennsauken Township, New Jersey. His father was an immigrant from St. Thomas, Danish West Indies. His mother was from Jordantown (Pennsauken Township), New Jersey. Walcott was only 15 years old when his father died. He quit school and worked in a soup factory to support his mother and 11 younger brothers and sisters. He also began training as a boxer. He took the name of his boxing idol, Joe Walcott, a welterweight champion from Barbados. He added "Jersey" to distinguish himself and show where he was from.

Boxing career
He debuted as a professional middleweight boxer on September 9, 1930, fighting Cowboy Wallace and winning by a knockout in round one. After five straight knockout wins, in 1933, he lost for the first time, beaten on points by Henry Wilson in Philadelphia.

Walcott lost two bouts to Tiger Jack Fox and was knocked out by heavyweight contender Abe Simon during his 10th year as a pro. After losing to Simon, Walcott was inactive for over four years between 1940 and 1944. Many heavyweights at the time were serving in the war, although Walcott does not have a military record.

Walcott had built a record of 45 wins, 11 losses and 1 draw before challenging for the world title for the first time. But that would change in 1945 when Walcott beat top heavyweights such as Joe Baksi, Lee Q. Murray, and Curtis Sheppard. He closed out 1946 with a pair of losses to light heavyweight Joey Maxim and top ranked heavyweight contender Elmer Ray, but he promptly avenged those defeats in 1947.

Walcott vs Louis 
On December 5, 1947, he fought Joe Louis, at thirty-three years of age breaking the record as the oldest man to fight for the world heavyweight title. Despite dropping Louis in round one and again in round four, he lost a 15-round split decision. Most ringside observers and boxing writers felt Walcott deserved the win; a debate ensued, and sportswriters carried the topic throughout America. The lone official to vote for Walcott, referee Ruby Goldstein, was cast as a hero. Letters and telegrams poured in to the Goldstein household, praising his judgment. There was talk of an investigation being assembled for rule revisions in judging. Louis went into seclusion for a couple of days, then quieted dissent with the following: "I know Ruby. He calls them as he sees them and that should be good enough for anybody."  What controversy remained was the kind that builds the gate, and Jersey Joe was rightfully granted a rematch on June 25, 1948. Though dropped again, this time in the third, Louis prevailed by a knockout in round 11. The bout was the first closed-circuit telecast (CCTV) sports broadcast, distributed via theatre television.

Walcott vs Charles 
On June 22 of 1949, Walcott got another chance to become world heavyweight champion when he and Ezzard Charles met for the title left vacant by Louis. However, Charles prevailed, winning by decision in 15 rounds. Walcott, disappointed but eager to see his dream of being a champion come true, went on, and in 1950 he won four of his five bouts, including a third-round knockout of future world light heavyweight champion Harold Johnson.

On March 7, 1951, he and Charles fought for a second time and again Charles won a 15-round decision to retain his world title. But on July 18, he joined a handful of boxers who claimed the world title in their fifth try, when he knocked out Charles in seven rounds in Pittsburgh to finally become world heavyweight champion at the age of 37. This made him the oldest man ever to win the world heavyweight crown a distinction he would hold until George Foreman won the title at age 45 in 1994.

Losing the Title 

Walcott retained the title with a 15-round decision victory against arch-enemy Charles. On September 23, 1952, he put his title on the line for the second time. His opponent was the undefeated Rocky Marciano. In the first round, Walcott floored Marciano with a left hook; the first time in his career that Rocky had ever been down. After twelve intense rounds, Walcott stood well ahead on two of the three official scorecards, leaving Marciano needing a knockout to win. In the thirteenth round, with Marciano pressuring Walcott against the ropes, simultaneously each threw a right hand.  Marciano landed first and flush on Walcott's jaw with a devastating right hook and a powerful left followup. The title changed hands in an instant. Walcott collapsed with his left arm hanging over the ropes, slowly sinking to the canvas, where he was counted out. An immediate rematch was set for May 15, 1953 in Chicago.  The second time around Walcott was again defeated by Marciano by a knockout, this time in the first round. It would be Walcott's last bout.

Life after boxing
Walcott did not go away from the celebrity scene after boxing. In 1956, he co-starred with Humphrey Bogart and Max Baer in the boxing drama The Harder They Fall. In 1963, he tried professional wrestling, losing to Lou Thesz. Thesz pinned Walcott in the fifth round, but has stated that Walcott knocked him (Thesz) down and most likely out in that fifth round. As he fell to the floor, he relied on instinct, grabbing Walcott's knees, taking him down with him and stretching him out for the pin.

In 1965, Walcott refereed the controversial world heavyweight championship rematch between Muhammad Ali and Sonny Liston. Walcott lost the count as Ali circled around a floored Liston and Walcott tried to get him back to a neutral corner. Walcott then looked outside of the ring (presumably to the ringside count keeper) as Ali and Liston went at each other, before Walcott instructed them to keep on fighting. Walcott then approached the fighters and abruptly stopped the fight. Walcott was never again appointed as a referee after this bout.

Political career
After retiring, Walcott worked for the Camden County corrections department. In 1968, he ran for Sheriff of Camden County, New Jersey, but lost in the Democratic primary to Spencer H. Smith Jr.  That same year he was named director of community relations for Camden.

In 1971, he ran again for Camden County Sheriff. He defeated Republican William Strang in the general election. He was the first African-American to serve as Sheriff in Camden County.

He served as chairman of the New Jersey State Athletic Commission from 1975 until 1984, when he stepped down at the mandatory retirement age of 70. Walcott was inducted into the International Boxing Hall of Fame in Canastota, New York.

Honors
In 2013, Walcott was inducted into the New Jersey Hall of Fame.

Partial filmography
The Harder They Fall (1956) - George
The Super Fight (1970) - Himself (voice)

Professional boxing record

See also
List of heavyweight boxing champions

References

External links

https://boxrec.com/media/index.php/NBA_World_Heavyweight_Title_Fights
https://boxrec.com/media/index.php/NYSAC_World_Heavyweight_Title_Fights
Jersey Joe Walcott - CBZ Profile
Boxing Hall of Fame

1914 births
1994 deaths
African-American boxers
African-American sheriffs
American people of United States Virgin Islands descent
Boxers from New Jersey
Heavyweight boxers
International Boxing Hall of Fame inductees
Sportspeople from Camden, New Jersey
People from Merchantville, New Jersey
People from Pennsauken Township, New Jersey
New Jersey Democrats
New Jersey sheriffs
American Protestants
World Boxing Association champions
World heavyweight boxing champions
American male boxers
20th-century American politicians
The Ring (magazine) champions
Stampede Wrestling alumni
American male professional wrestlers
Professional wrestlers from New Jersey
20th-century African-American politicians
American male actors